Ogunquit Playhouse is a regional theater at 10 Main Street (United States Route 1) in Ogunquit, Maine. Ogunquit Playhouse is one of the last remaining summer theaters from the Summer Stock which still produces musical theatre. The Playhouse is listed on the National Register of Historic Places as a National Level of Significance "in consideration of the significant contributions made by its founder Walter J. Hartwig and the Playhouse to Performing Arts Education throughout the nation."

About 
Ogunquit Playhouse produces four or more shows each season, running May through October, with performances Tuesday through Sunday. Creative teams are brought in from around the world; casting for each show is hand-picked from Broadway and Regional actors in New York, Los Angeles, and across the country; and their commitment to New Works has given the industry world premiere musicals such as Heartbreak Hotel, Mystic Pizza, The Nutty Professor, and Mr. Holland's Opus.

Ogunquit Playhouse Arts Academy 
Theatre education at The Playhouse began in the 1930s, under the direction of founder Walter Hartwig. Up-and-coming young actors trained in the theatre arts by the best and brightest talents of Broadway and Regional theaters. In the 1990s, the Playhouse began a wildly successful summer camp program, in which students were in class and rehearsals five days a week, culminating in a final mainstage performance of a full-scale production. In 2020, the Playhouse Arts Academy was born under the guidance of Education Director Joyce Presutti. With three seasons of programming and performances and students transitioning into mainstage productions, the Academy continues to grow and thrive in bold new ways.

History 
Ogunquit Playhouse was established by Walter and Maude Hartwig in 1933 in a renovated garage in the center of Ogunquit, Maine. As part of the Little Theatre Movement of the 1920s and early 30s, Walter Hartwig organized an annual theatre tournament in New York. When the Depression put an end to the tournament, Hartwig started the Manhattan Theatre Colony and brought it to the town of Ogunquit. In 1937, the theatre moved to a new building at its present-day location on Main Street in Ogunquit, Maine. The Ogunquit Playhouse was the first, and remains the only, summer theatre from the summer stock era built exclusively as a seasonal theatre. After Walter's death in 1941, Maude carried on his legacy at the Playhouse.

In 1950, John Lane became the general manager and eventually took ownership of the Playhouse with his business partner, Henry Weller.  Together they focused on modernizing and improving the building and grounds, and through John Lane's direction, audiences enjoyed the brightest stars and finest professional actors performing in Broadway's best shows. After a long and successful career, John Lane retired in 1994. He transferred ownership to the Ogunquit Playhouse Foundation, a not-for-profit foundation that currently oversees the Ogunquit Playhouse. John Lane died in 2000.

In September 1999, Roy M. Rogosin was hired as Producing Artistic Director to help usher the Playhouse towards a new era. During this transition, the playhouse began producing its own shows, designing and building sets, designing costumes and bringing back the stars. The old Manhattan Theatre Colony building was restored as a rehearsal space. At the same time, the Children's Theatre Program began, and continues today. The program provides a number of educational opportunities for children and teens interested in theatre, both as performers and behind-the-scenes. In 2006, Bradford Kenney came on board as the new Executive Artistic Director. The theatre expanded from a 10-week to a 21-week season.

Ogunquit Playhouse celebrated its 75th year in 2007 with seven shows. The season included a revival of 2006's Menopause The Musical, The Full Monty with Hunter Foster and Sally Struthers, Crazy for You with Rue McClanahan, La Cage aux Folles, The King and I with Lorenzo Lamas, Hairspray, and closed with a revival of The Full Monty with Hunter Foster and Sally Struthers.

The Playhouse celebrated 80 years in theatre with productions of Sally Struthers in Always, Patsy Cline and 9 to 5, Rodgers and Hammerstein's South Pacific, Carson Kressley in Damn Yankees The Boston Red Sox Version, and Ballroom with a Twist featuring celebrity pros and talents from Dancing with the Stars, American Idol and So You Think You Can Dance, including Anna Trebunskaya and Jonathan Roberts. The season closed with what became the theatre's most popular musical ever, Buddy - The Buddy Holly Story starring Kurt Jenkins.

Shows 
Shows by season for the last 13 seasons:

* – World premiere

** – Regional premiere

*** – Play, not a musical

Notable performers
Performers who have appeared at the Ogunquit Playhouse include the following:

Clay Aiken – Joseph in Joseph and the Amazing Technicolor Dreamcoat (2013)
Krystina Alabado – Daisy Araújo in Mystic Pizza (2021)
Clyde Alves – Jerry Mulligan in An American in Paris (2018)
Lucie Arnaz
Matthew Ashford – Franklin Hart in 9 to 5 (2012)
James Barbour – Darryl Van Horne in The Witches of Eastwick (2014)
 Ethel Barrymore
Anastasia Barzee – Mrs. Wilkinson in Billy Elliot the Musical (2014), Iris Holland in Mr. Holland's Opus (2022)
Klea Blackhurst – Miss Lemon in The Nutty Professor (2022)
Steve Blanchard – Julian Marsh in 42nd Street (2019)
John Bolton – Dr. Frederick Frankenstein in Young Frankenstein (2013), Dr. Frederick Frankenstein in Young Frankenstein (2021)
Lisa Brescia – Victoria Grant in Victor/Victoria (2015)
Meg Bussert – The Mother Abbess in The Sound of Music (2010)
Patrick Cassidy – Sam Carmichael in Mamma Mia! (2017)
Maxwell Caulfield – Georges in La Cage aux Folles (2007)
Jennifer Cody – Joy in Cinderella (2006), Natalie Haller in All Shook Up (2009), Gloria Thorpe in Damn Yankees (The Boston Red Sox Version) (2012), Patsy in Monty Python's Spamalot (2021)
Veanne Cox – Helen Chae-Jacobs in Mr. Holland's Opus (2022)
Bette Davis
Bradley Dean – Claude Frollo in The Hunchback of Notre Dame (2016), Lt. Dana Holmes in From Here to Eternity (2017)
Rachel deBenedet – Anna Leonowens in The King and I (2007), Morticia Addams in The Addams Family (2014)
Emma Degerstedt – Performer in Smokey Joe's Cafe (2018)
Jeffry Denman – Bobby Child in Crazy for You (2007), Sir Robin in Monty Python's Spamalot (2010), Phil Davis in White Christmas (2015), Rooster Hannigan in Annie (2019)
Ed Dixon – Max Goldman in Grumpy Old Men (2018)
Nancy Dussault – Mrs. Higgins in My Fair Lady (2008)
Jarrod Emick – Tick / Mitzi in Priscilla, Queen of the Desert (2016)
David Engel – Gomez Addams in The Addams Family (2014), Harry Bright in Mamma Mia! (2017), Bob Mackie / Frank / Robert Altman in The Cher Show (2022)
Georgia Engel – Mrs. Tottendale in The Drowsy Chaperone (2010)
Cory English – Max Bialystock in The Producers (2008)
Hunter Foster – Jerry Lukowski in The Full Monty (2007)
Mo Gaffney – Miss Lynch in Grease (2014)
Sara Gettelfinger – Alexandra Spofford in The Witches of Eastwick (2014), Star in The Cher Show (2022)
Anita Gillette – Princess Dragomiroff in Murder on the Orient Express (2019)
Josh Grisetti – Sir Robin in Monty Python's Spamalot (2021)
Becky Gulsvig – Elle Woods in Legally Blonde (2011), Doralee Rhodes in 9 to 5 (2012), Millie Dillmount in Thoroughly Modern Millie (2013)
Valerie Harper – Millicent Winter in Nice Work If You Can Get It (2015)
Randy Harrison – The Master of Ceremonies in Cabaret (2019)
Mariette Hartley – Fräulein Schneider in Cabaret (2019)
Christian Hoff – Sky Masterson in Guys and Dolls (2009)
Cady Huffman – Miss Sandra in All Shook Up (2009)
Mark Jacoby – John Gustafson in Grumpy Old Men (2018)
Zachary James – The Monster in Young Frankenstein (2021)
Tim Jerome – Alfred P. Doolittle in My Fair Lady (2008)
Mel Johnson Jr. – Harrington Winslow in The Nutty Professor (2022)
Van Johnson
Richard Kind – Nathan Detroit in Guys and Dolls (2009)
Paul Kreppel – Amos Hart in Chicago (2010)
Carson Kressley – The Man in Chair in The Drowsy Chaperone (2010), Mr. Applegate in Damn Yankees (The Boston Red Sox Version) (2012)
Lorenzo Lamas – The King of Siam in The King and I (2007), Zach in A Chorus Line (2009)
Ryan Landry – The Stepmother in Cinderella (2006), Edna Turnblad in Hairspray (2007), Roger De Bris in The Producers (2008), Thénardier in Les Misérables (2008)
Liz Larsen – Miss Adelaide in Guys and Dolls (2009), The Drowsy Chaperone in The Drowsy Chaperone (2010)
Hal Linden – Grandpa Gustafson in Grumpy Old Men (2018)
Myrna Loy
Stanley Wayne Mathis – Lionel, The Royal Steward in Cinderella (2006)
Jefferson Mays – Henry Higgins in My Fair Lady (2008)
 Andrea McArdle – Sally Bowles in Cabaret (2006), Fantine in Les Misérables (2008), Reno Sweeney in Anything Goes (2016)
Jeff McCarthy – Dr. Warfield in The Nutty Professor (2022)
Rue McClanahan – Mother in Crazy for You (2007)
Eddie Mekka – Wilbur Turnblad in Hairspray (2007), Tevye in Fiddler on the Roof (2008)
Paolo Montalbán – The Prince in Cinderella (2006), Lun Tha in The King and I (2007), Clopin in The Hunchback of Notre Dame (2016)
Crista Moore – Baroness Elsa Schräder in The Sound of Music (2010)
 Sydney Morton – Esmeralda in The Hunchback of Notre Dame (2016)
Burke Moses – Mr. Trevor Graydon in Thoroughly Modern Millie (2013)
Robert Newman – Oliver "Daddy" Warbucks in Annie (2019)
Christiane Noll – Winifred Banks in Mary Poppins (2014)
Bill Nolte – Franz Liebkind in The Producers (2008), Jacob / Potiphar / Baker in Joseph and the Amazing Technicolor Dreamcoat (2013)
Chris Orbach – Bill Meister in Mr. Holland's Opus (2022)
Vincent Pastore – Nick Valenti in Bullets Over Broadway (2017)
Jennifer Paz – Kim in Miss Saigon (2011)
Joel Perez – Tim Travers in Mystic Pizza (2021)
Stefanie Powers – Norma Desmond in Sunset Boulevard (2010)
William Powell
Michele Ragusa – Helen Sinclair in Bullets Over Broadway (2017)
Steven Rattazzi – Hercule Poirot in Murder on the Orient Express (2019)
Darren Ritchie – King Marchan in Victor/Victoria (2015)
Soara-Joye Ross – Elizabeth in Young Frankenstein (2021)
John Rubinstein – Herr Schultz in Cabaret (2019)
Gabrielle Ruiz – Anita in West Side Story (2013)
Michael Rupert – Professor Callahan in Legally Blonde (2011)
John Schuck – Colonel Pickering in My Fair Lady (2008)
Angie Schworer – Irene Roth in Crazy for You (2007), Roxie Hart in Chicago (2010), Tanya in Mamma Mia! (2017), Lily St. Regis in Annie (2019), Georgia Holt / Lucille Ball in The Cher Show (2022)
Peter Scolari – Harold Hill in The Music Man (2011)
Keala Settle – The Narrator in Joseph and the Amazing Technicolor Dreamcoat (2013)
Coleen Sexton – Brooke Wyndham in Legally Blonde (2011), Marion / Diva in Priscilla, Queen of the Desert (2016)
 Charles Shaughnessy – King Arthur in Monty Python's Spamalot (2010), King Arthur in Monty Python's Spamalot (2021)
Kate Shindle – Sally Bowles in Cabaret (2019)
Megan Sikora – Val in A Chorus Line (2009)
Timothy John Smith – Jud Fry in Oklahoma! (2018)
Rex Smith – Captain Georg von Trapp in The Sound of Music (2010)
Dale Soules – Grandma in Billy Elliot the Musical (2014)
Edward Staudenmayer – Del Delmonico in Breaking Up Is Hard to Do (2008), Franklin Hart in 9 to 5 (2012)
Sally Struthers – Mona Stangley in The Best Little Whorehouse in Texas (2005), Miss Dolly Gallagher Levi in Hello, Dolly! (2006), Jeanette Burmeister in The Full Monty (2007), Golde in Fiddler on the Roof (2008), Mayor Matilda Hyde in All Shook Up (2009),  Matron "Mama" Morton in Chicago (2010), Paulette Buonufonte	in Legally Blonde (2011), Louise Seger in Always, Patsy Cline (2012), Roz in 9 to 5 (2012), Mrs. Meers in Thoroughly Modern Millie (2013), Felicia Gabriel in The Witches of Eastwick (2014), Duchess Estonia Dulworth in Nice Work If You Can Get It (2015), Evangeline Harcourt in Anything Goes (2016), Eden Brent in Bullets Over Broadway (2017), Martha Watson in White Christmas (2017), Punky Olander in Grumpy Old Men (2018), Maggie Jones in 42nd Street (2019), Miss Hanningan in Annie (2019), Frau Blucher in Young Frankenstein (2021)
Jane Summerhays – Jacqueline in La Cage aux Folles (2007)
Renée Taylor – Esther in Breaking Up Is Hard to Do (2008)
 Leslie Uggams – The Fairy Godmother in Cinderella (2006)
Brenda Vaccaro – Millicent Winter in Nice Work If You Can Get It (2015)
Cindy Williams – Hostess in Menopause The Musical (2019)
Rachel York – The Lady of the Lake in Monty Python's Spamalot (2010), Dorothy Brock in 42nd Street (2019)
Josh Young – Marius in Les Misérables (2008), Tateh in Ragtime (2017)
Stuart Zagnit – Harvey in Breaking Up Is Hard to Do (2008)
Adrian Zmed – Harold Nichols in The Full Monty (2007)

Awards and Recognitions

New England Theatre Conference (NETC) 
 Moss Hart Award for West Side Story (2013) 
 Moss Hart Award for Best Professional Production in New England for The Music Man (2011)
 Award for Outstanding Achievement in American Theatre (2010)

BroadwayWorld.com Maine Awards 
Billy Elliot the Musical (2014) 
Best Musical
Best Actor in a Play - Noah Parets
Best Choreography - Adam Pelty
Best Dance Performance in a Musical - Noah Parets
Best Director (play or musical) - BT McNicholl
Best Ensemble Performance in a Play or Musical
Best Vocal Performance in a Musical - Noah Parets

Joseph and the Amazing Technicolor Dreamcoat (2013) 
Best Musical
Best Actor in a Musical - Clay Aiken
Best Actress in a Musical - Keala Settle
Best Choreography - Jayme McDaniel
Best Director (play or musical) - Jayme McDaniel
Best Costume Design (play or musical) - Dustin Cross
Best Ensemble Performance in a Play or Musical
Best Lighting and/or Sound Design - Eric Martin
Best Scenic Design (play or musical) - Geof Dolan
Best Vocal Performance in a Musical - Clay Aiken

ecomaine Awards 
eco-Excellence Community Award for the town of Ogunquit*

References

External links 

Official site

Theatres completed in 1937
Buildings and structures in Ogunquit, Maine
Colonial Revival architecture in Maine
Theatres on the National Register of Historic Places in Maine
Tourist attractions in York County, Maine
National Register of Historic Places in York County, Maine
Theatres in Maine
1930s establishments in Maine